Pathius maculatus is a species of leaf beetle of Yemen, described by Gilbert Ernest Bryant in 1957.

References

Eumolpinae
Beetles of Asia
Insects of the Arabian Peninsula
Beetles described in 1957
Endemic fauna of Yemen